Hidetoshi (written: 英寿, 英俊, 英敏, 英利, 秀俊, 秀敏, 秀利 or 秀稔) is a masculine Japanese given name. Notable people with the name include:

, Japanese sumo wrestler
, Japanese sumo wrestler
, Japanese racing driver
, Japanese footballer
, Japanese sculptor and architect
, Japanese voice actor
, Japanese footballer
, Japanese judoka
, Japanese voice actor
, Japanese politician
, Japanese luger
, Japanese sumo wrestler
, Japanese footballer

Japanese masculine given names